Puya cardenasii is a species in the genus Puya. This species is endemic to Bolivia.

References

cardenasii
Flora of Bolivia